The Central Bank of Nigeria is the central bank and apex monetary authority of Nigeria established by the CBN Act of 1958 and commenced operations on 1 July 1959.

The major regulatory objectives of the bank as stated in the CBN Act are to: maintain the external reserves of the country, promote monetary stability and a sound financial environment, and act as a banker of last resort and financial adviser to the federal government. The central bank's role as lender of last resort and adviser to the federal government has sometimes pushed it into murky regulatory waters. After the end of imperial rule the desire of the government to become pro-active in the development of the economy became visible especially after the end of the Nigerian civil war, the bank followed the government's desire and took a determined effort to supplement any show shortfalls, credit allocations to the real sector. The bank became involved in lending directly to consumers, contravening its original intention to work through commercial banks in activities involving consumer lending.

However, the policy was an offspring of the indigenization policy at the time. Nevertheless, the government through the central bank has been actively involved in building the nation's money and equity centers, forming securities regulatory boards, and introducing treasury instruments into the capital market. The bank has thirty-six branches each in the 36 states of the federation and the headquarters in FCT.

CBN Library 
The Library is a standard library at the Headquarters and all other branches, its has information resources like journals, magazines, books of various field of study can be used and the library is open for students, researchers and staff.

History of the CBN

Authorizing legislation 

In 1948, an inquiry under the leadership of G.D Paton was established by the colonial administration to investigate banking practices in Nigeria. Prior to the inquiry, the banking industry was largely uncontrolled.

The G.D Paton report, an offshoot of the inquiry became the cornerstone of the first banking legislation in the country: the banking ordinance of 1952. The ordinance was designed to prevent non-viable banks from mushrooming and to ensure orderly commercial banking. The banking ordinance triggered rapid growth in the industry, and with growth also came disappointment. By 1958, a few banks had failed. To curtail further failures and to prepare for indigenous control, in 1958, a bill for the establishment of the Central Bank of Nigeria was presented to the House of Representatives of Nigeria. The Central Bank of Nigeria Act No. 24, 1958 was published as chapter 30 of the 1958 edition of the Laws of Nigeria and Lagos. It was fully implemented on 1 July 1959, when the Central Bank of Nigeria came into full operation and remained the primary statute governing the CBN until its repeal by the Central Bank of Nigeria Act No.24, 1991. In April 1960, the Bank issued its first treasury bills. In May 1961, the Bank launched the Lagos Bankers Clearing House, which provided licensed banks a framework in which to exchange and clear checks rapidly. By 1 July 1961, the Bank had completed issuing all denominations of new Nigerian notes and coins and redeemed all of the British West African pounds that were circulating in Nigeria.

Building Structure

The Central Bank of Nigeria is known for the blue color on its office building at different branches of the country.

Policy implementation and criticism

The CBN's early functions were mainly to act as the government's agency for the control and supervision of the banking sector, to monitor the balance of payments according to the demands of the federal government and to tailor monetary policy along the demands of the federal budget. A key instrument of the bank was to initiate credit limit legislation for bank lending. The initiative was geared to make credit available to neglected national areas such as agriculture and manufacturing. By the end of 1979, most of the banks did not adhere to their credit limits and favoured a loose interpretation of CBN's guidelines.

The central bank did not effectively curtail the prevalence of short term loan maturities. Most loans given out by commercial banks were usually set within a year. The major policy to balance this distortion in the credit market was to create a new Bank of Commerce and industry, a universal bank. However, the new bank did not fulfill its mission.  Another policy of the bank in concert with the intentions of the government was direct involvement in the affairs of the three major expatriate commercial banks in order to forestall any bias against indigenous borrowers and consumers. By 1976, the federal government had acquired 40% of equity in the three largest commercial banks. The bank's slow reaction to curtail inflation by financing huge deficits of the federal government has been one of the sore points in the history of the central bank. Coupled with its failure to control the burgeoning trade arrears in 1983, the country was left with huge trade debts totaling $6 billion.

Governors of the Central Bank of Nigeria

Governors of the Central Bank since independence:

Under Charles Chukwuma Soludo

The Central Bank was instrumental in the growth and financial credibility of Nigerian commercial banks by making sure that all the financial banks operating in the country had a capital base (required reserves). This helped to ensure that bank customers just did not bear losses alone, in the event of bank failures. However, this policy led to the failure of some Nigerian commercial banks; some banks could not meet up with the new capital base requirements, which was 25,000,000,000.00 Naira at the time. Those banks that could not meet the new capital base requirements had to fold up, while some that could not come up with the money on their own, had to merge with other banks in order to raise the money. This policy helped solidify the commercial banks of Nigeria, and made it impossible for individuals or organizations without financial stability to operate a bank in the country. Today Nigeria has one of the most advanced financial sectors in Africa, with most of its commercial banks having branches in other countries.

The Central Bank is active in promoting financial inclusion policy and is a leading member of the Alliance for Financial Inclusion. It is also one of the original 17 regulatory institutions to make specific national commitments to financial inclusion under the Maya Declaration during the 2011 Global Policy Forum held in Mexico. The CBN has ensured all Banks in Nigeria to have a uniform year end. The various commercial bank includes Access Bank Plc, Citibank Nigeria Plc, Diamond Bank Plc, First Bank of Nigeria Plc, Guaranty Trust Bank Plc, Zenith Bank plc, Wema Bank, StanbicIbtc Bank, Fidelity Bank, United Bank for Africa etc.

Changes in the 21st century 

In 2009, the CBN fired the CEOs and executive directors of 5 Nigerian banks (Afribank, FinBank Nigeria, Intercontinental Bank, Oceanic Bank and Union Bank of Nigeria) for mismanagement of loans and over-reliance on the CBN. In 2014, the President Goodluck Jonathan suspended the governor of the CBN Sanusi Lamido Sanusi on grounds of financial recklessness. In April 2021, the Central Bank of Nigeria fired the whole board of the First Bank of Nigeria which was in a «grave financial condition».

In July 2021, CBN announced that it had ended the sales of foreign exchange (forex) to bureau de change operators. Following the announcement, all forex sales were to go directly to commercial banks. That same month the Bank’s governor, Godwin Emefiele, said that Nigeria would launch its own cryptocurrency, called “e-naira,” in October, which is not a cryptocurrency per say but effectively build on the blockchain technology and available through the mobile applications eNaira Speed Wallet and eNaira Speed Merchant Wallet. At its launching by President Muhammadu Buhari on 25 October, the platform was joined by 33 banks and ₦500m worth of enaira mint was minted. The introduction of the eNaira came a few months after the government has banned all cryptocurrencies.

Leadership

Mr. Godwin Emefiele, the former Zenith Bank Plc Chief Executive took up the mantle as the 11th CBN chief, and its 10th indigenous governor. Emefiele replaced Mallam Sanusi Lamido Sanusi, whose tenure elapsed on 1 June. Before becoming the Managing Director of Zenith Bank Plc, Emefiele worked in corporate banking, as well as treasury and financial controls. Before that, he was a lecturer in Finance and Insurance at the University of Port Harcourt, as well as his alma mater, University of Nigeria, Nsukka, where he obtained both BSc and MBA degrees in Finance. He is an alumnus of Executive Education at Stanford University, Harvard University and Wharton Graduate Schools of Business.
Emefiele in his maiden press briefing two days after his assumption of office gave a presentation titled, "Entrenching Macroeconomic Stability and Engendering Economic Development in Nigeria." He maintained that the vision of the Central Bank of Nigeria is to create a people-centered Central Bank by "delivering price and financial system stability and promoting sustainable economic development''. On 16 May 2019, Emefiele was reappointed as Governor of CBN. He is to spend the next five years in office. This is the first time since 1999 that a governor will serve for two consecutive terms. The Director of Currency Operations of the CBN is Mrs. Priscilla Ekwere Eleje. She is the first woman to attain that position.

Statutory Duties and Powers 

The Central Bank of Nigeria (Establishment) Act 2007 affirms the establishment of a body known as the Central Bank of Nigeria. The act also states the fundamental objects of the bank, which include the sole power to issue notes and coins, maintain an external reserve for Nigeria, and generally supervise the entire banking system in Nigeria.

The Banks and Other Financial Institutions Act, 2020, empowers the Governor of the CBN to issue a license to anyone wanting to start a banking business in Nigeria, with specific procedures. The act prohibits anyone from operating a banking business in Nigeria without such a license. Additionally, the BOFIA empowers the Governor of the CBN to issue regulations, guidelines and policies to banks, specialized banks, and other financial institutions in Nigeria.  And to appoint officers to supervise and examine these institutions according to the dictates of the governor. Also, Section 5 of the BOFIA empowers the CBN to revoke the license of any bank for stipulated reasons.

See also

 Nigerian pound
 Nigerian naira
 Payment system
 Real-time gross settlement
 Bank Verification Number
 Treasury single account
 Cashless Policy (Nigeria)
 Banking in Nigeria
 Zero COT
 List of central banks of Africa
 List of central banks

Notes

References

 E. O. Oloyede, The Bank Customer and Banking Law in Nigeria, Journal of African Law, Vol. 19, No. 1/2,  Spring, 1975
 G. O. Nwankwo, Bank Lending in a Developing Economy: The Nigerian Experience, Journal of African Law, Vol. 19, Spring, 1975
 "Foreign reserves down, bank lending up as economy falters", Financial Times, 29 November 1982
 Ugo A. Okoroafor  "Currency Restructuring in the CBN", cenbank.org, 20 September 2012

External links
  Official Website of Central Bank of Nigeria
 The Official Website of Godwin Emefiele, Governor of CBN

 
Government agencies established in 1958
1958 establishments in Nigeria
Banks established in 1958